Skeletophyllon friedeli is a moth in the family Cossidae. It was described by Yakovlev in 2006. It is found in southern Thailand.

The length of the forewings is 16.5–18 mm. There is a streaky pattern on the forewings, as well as a row of brown spots along the costal margin. The hindwings are white with a streaky pattern and a large brown spot at the hindwing margin.

Etymology
The species is named in honour of G. Friedel.

References

Natural History Museum Lepidoptera generic names catalog

Zeuzerinae
Moths described in 2006